Henry "Rusty" Fein (born June 24, 1982 in Washington, D.C.) is an American former competitive figure skater, who competed in both singles and pairs. He skated in pairs with Tiffany Scott, with whom he is the 2006 U.S. national pewter medalist and alternate for the 2006 U.S. World and Olympic Teams.

Personal life 

Fein was born in Washington, DC.  He graduated from the University of Pennsylvania in 2006 with a degree in economics, after which he joined J.P. Morgan & Co. in New York City as an investment analyst.  Fein is a trustee of the U.S. Figure Skating Foundation.  In 2014, he graduated from Stanford Graduate School of Business with an MBA.  As an adult, he legally adopted his mother's maiden name (Lippincott) as his surname.

Skating career 
Fein competed internationally as a singles skater before competing in pairs.  He placed 13th at the 2001 Finlandia Trophy and won gold at the 1999 North American Challenge Skate. He won two silver medals at the US National Collegiate Figure Skating Championships on the senior level and won the US National Collegiate Figure Skating Championships in Junior in 2000.

As a pair skater, Fein teamed up with Tiffany Scott in 2005. They placed 5th at the 2005 Nebelhorn Trophy and won the pewter medal at the 2006 U.S. Figure Skating Championships.  They were subsequently named alternates for the 2006 Winter Olympics in Turin, Italy.  They competed together until 2006.

In 2008, sports media reported that Fein would return to competitive skating, pairing with 2005 U.S. National Champion Katie Orscher, but the partnership never materialized.

Results

Pairs
(with Scott)

Men's singles

Programs 
(with Scott)

References

External links
 Official site
 University of Pennsylvania Figure Skating Club bio
 SkateToday: Scott Joins Fein to Continue Pairs Career
 USFSA bio
 Katie Orscher's new partner

American male single skaters
American male pair skaters
1982 births
Living people
University of Pennsylvania alumni
Stanford Graduate School of Business alumni